is a former Japanese football player.

Playing career
Gen was born in Osaka Prefecture on August 6, 1973. After graduating from Kindai University, he joined J1 League club Verdy Kawasaki in 1996. The club won second place at the 1996 J.League Cup and won the 1996 Emperor's Cup. Although he played several matches as forward every season until 1998, he did not play many matches overall. In 1999, he moved to Cerezo Osaka. However he did not play at all and retired at the end of the 1999 season.

Club statistics

References

External links

1973 births
Living people
Kindai University alumni
Association football people from Osaka Prefecture
Japanese footballers
J1 League players
Tokyo Verdy players
Cerezo Osaka players
Association football forwards